In the sport of cricket, playing 100 Test matches is considered to be a significant achievement. Colin Cowdrey of England was the first cricketer to have reached this landmark, celebrating the occasion with a score of 104 runs against Australia in 1968 during the 1968 Ashes series. In February 2021, Joe Root played his 100th Test during England's tour of India, in which he became the quickest player to reach that landmark, and the first to score a double century in their 100th Test.

Sachin Tendulkar of India is the only cricketer to have played in 200 Test matches, a milestone he reached in his final match, on 13 November 2013 against the West Indies, at Mumbai's Wankhede Stadium.

, 74 cricketers have reached this landmark, including 15 from England, the most among all Test-playing teams.

Players with 100+ Test matches

Following is the list of cricketers who have played 100 or more Test matches.

By teams

References

Lists of cricketers
Test cricket records
Lists of Test cricketers